Olallie Scenic Area is a United States Forest Service designated scenic area located in Oregon's Cascade Range. It is between Mount Hood on the north and Mount Jefferson to the south and contains Olallie Lake along with several smaller lakes. The name Olallie is Chinook Jargon for berry. Olallie Lake is open to vehicle traffic June to September. There is no cellphone service.

Details
The glaciated region is roughly 89% forested with Noble fir, western hemlock, cedar species, pacific silver fir, mountain hemlock and several other tree species. Crossed by the Pacific Crest Trail, Olallie is in the shadow of Mount Jefferson within the Mount Hood National Forest. The volcanic peaks of  Mount Jefferson and  Olallie Butte, both located on the border of the Warm Springs Indian Reservation, overlook the area from the south and north. Olallie Lake Guard Station is listed on the National Register of Historic Places and is near the west end of Olallie Lake.

Recreation includes camping at Forest Service improved campgrounds, cabins and yurts at the Olallie Lake Resort. The use of motor boats is prohibited on the snow melt fed alpine lakes by state law; the Olallie Resort has paddle boats and rowboats for rent. Access is via Forest Road 46 to Forest Road 4690 to Forest Road 4220 or from Forest Road 42 to Forest Road 4220. These roads are closed in the winter. The last few miles of Forest Road 4220 are gravel. The Scenic Area has seven campgrounds; they are Olallie Meadows, Camp Ten, Paul Dennis, Peninsula, Lower Lake, Horseshoe Lake, and Triangle Lake Equestrian.

Lakes

The largest of these lakes is the namesake Olallie Lake that has a  shoreline. The Oregon Department of Fish and Wildlife stocks the lake with both Rainbow trout and Brook trout. Mill Creek on the eastern shore is the only outflow, and once had a small dam to help keep water levels constant. Other lakes include Triangle, Lower, First, Head, Horse Shoe, Spoon, Surprise, Fish, Giffords, View, Top, Fork, Upper, Timber, Red, Averil, Wall, Sheep, and countless more.

See also 
 List of lakes in Oregon

References

External links
Mount Hood National Forest
Red Lake Trail (PDF)

Cascade Range
Lakes of Oregon
Protected areas of Jefferson County, Oregon
Protected areas of Marion County, Oregon
Mount Hood National Forest
Landforms of Jefferson County, Oregon
Landforms of Marion County, Oregon